Kanwal is a suburb of the Central Coast region of New South Wales, Australia. It is part of the  local government area and is approximately 90 km north of Sydney, 55 km south of Newcastle and 6 km west of the Pacific Ocean.

History
The area now known as Kanwal was a subdivision of Warnervale.

Kanwal is said to mean "snakes indeed" in a local Aboriginal language.

Landmarks
The dominating feature of Kanwal is the Wyong Rugby League Club to the northeast of the suburb. It is home to the Wyong Roos, a rugby league football club, three sporting ovals, two netball courts and a youth and community centre. There are several parks in Kanwal including Craigie Park to the east facing onto Tuggerah Lake, a wetland area to the northwest and another sporting oval to the south separate from the Rugby League Club. Other landmarks in the area include a small shopping village, a primary school, three aged care facilities, four buildings of religious worship and a caravan park.

Transport
The area is serviced by four regular bus routes, operating between Lake Haven Shopping Centre and Wyong railway station or Westfield Tuggerah. All four routes split up in different directions at Kanwal, two servicing the northern and western areas and the other two servicing eastern and southern areas together.

The Newcastle and Central Coast railway line that services some of Sydney, the Central Coast and most of Newcastle passes close by at Warnervale. Warnervale railway station lies approximately 4 km to the west of Kanwal and one of the bus routes mentioned passes it several times a day. However, Wyong railway station also lies approximately 6 km to the southwest, is serviced by all four bus routes frequently and has more train services operating from it, including the CountryLink service.

Politics
Kanwal belongs to the Australian electoral division of Dobell that covers approximately 952 km2 and is named after the prominent Australian sculptor and painter Sir William Dobell. In the federal election of 2004 Kanwal contributed 2,652 of the 75,398 votes in the division and saw Ken Ticehurst of the Liberal Party receive 1,108 of them (45.86%), followed by David Mehan of the Australian Labor Party with 979 votes (40.52%) and Scott Ian Rickard of the Australian Greens party with 111 votes (4.59%). Ken Ticehurst went on to win the seat of Salmon for the second time in a row after the election of 2001 with 42,151 of the 75,398 votes (55.90%).

Kanwal is also a part of the Electoral district of Wyong and in the state election of 2003 contributed 3008 out of 46,884 total votes in the electoral district. Paul Crittenden of the Australian Labor Party received 1,598 of the votes (53.13%), followed by Ben Morton of the Liberal Party with 984 votes (32.71%) and Scott Ian Rickard of the Australian Greens party with 128 votes (4.26%). Paul Crittenden went on to win the election with a total of 24,644 (53.82%) votes.

Notes

References

 RP Data property reports.  Free suburb profile (Kanwal)
 Domain. Suburb Snapshot
 Wyong Shire Council. About Wyong Shire.
 Bennett, F. C.,  The History of Wyong Shire.

External links
 Kanwal Public School

Suburbs of the Central Coast (New South Wales)